Arthrolycosidae is an extinct family of arachnids, possibly spiders. Fossils placed in the family were found in the Carboniferous to Permian, . They were considered by Alexander Petrunkevitch to be "mesotheles", i.e. placed in the spider suborder Mesothelae. However, Paul A. Selden has stated they only have "the general appearance of spiders", with segmented abdomens (opisthosomae), but no definite spinnerets. At least some of the specimens placed in the family in the genus Arthrolycosa are considered to be spiders, whereas Eocteniza is "rather problematic as a spider".

Genera
Genera placed in the Arthrolycosidae  are shown below, together with the location of the fossils.

 †Arthrolycosa Harger, 1874  – United States (Mazon Creek), Ukraine, Russia
 †Eocteniza Pocock, 1911 – England (Coseley)

References 

Paleozoic arachnids
†